A life tenure or service during good behaviour is a term of office that lasts for the office holder's lifetime, unless the office holder is removed from office for cause under misbehaving in office, extraordinary circumstances or decides personally to resign.

Some judges and members of  upper chambers (e.g., senators for life) have life tenure. The primary goal of life tenure is to insulate the officeholder from external pressures. Certain heads of state, such as monarchs and presidents for life, are also given life tenure. United States federal judges have life tenure once appointed by the president and confirmed by the Senate.

In some cases, life tenure lasts only until a mandatory retirement age. For example, Canadian senators are appointed for life, but are forced to retire at 75. Likewise, many judges, including Justices of the Supreme Court of the United Kingdom, have life tenure but must retire at 70.

Life tenure also exists in various religious organizations. The Pope, as the Bishop of Rome and leader of the worldwide Catholic Church, has life tenure, but other Catholic bishops are required to submit their resignations at age 75.

Senior professors at academic institutions may also be granted life tenure, which is intended to protect principles of academic freedom.

References 

Selection of judges in the United States
Life tenure
Term of office